Short track speed skating at the 2009 Winter Universiade was held from 19 to 23 February 2009 in the Harbin University of Science and Technology Skating Gym.

Men's events

Women's events

Medals table

References 

Short track speed skating
Winter Universiade
Speed skating in China
2009